In category theory, a branch of mathematics, Grothendieck's homotopy hypothesis states that the ∞-groupoids are spaces. If we model our ∞-groupoids as Kan complexes, then the homotopy types of the geometric realizations of these sets give models for every homotopy type. It is conjectured that there are many different "equivalent" models for ∞-groupoids all which can be realized as homotopy types.

See also 
Pursuing Stacks
N-group (category theory)

References 
John Baez, The Homotopy Hypothesis

External links 

What is the mistake in the proof of the Homotopy hypothesis by Kapranov and Voevodsky?
Jacob Lurie's Home Page

Homotopy theory
Higher category theory
Hypotheses
Conjectures